Danny Isidora (born June 5, 1994) is an American football guard who is a free agent. He played college football at Miami (FL). Isidora was drafted by the Minnesota Vikings in the fifth round of the 2017 NFL Draft. He has also played for the Miami Dolphins and Kansas City Chiefs.

Early years
A three-star recruit out of Cypress Bay High School, Isidora was regarded as the No. 13 offensive guard prospect and No. 39 overall prospect in the state of Florida according to ESPN. Isidora chose to attend Miami over Wisconsin and Florida State.

College career
Isidora redshirted his first year on campus to get stronger and then missed the first 10 games of the 2013 season due to a foot injury. He earned the right-guard spot at the start of the 2014 season and did not relinquish it through the rest of his career. After the 2016 season, Isidora was one of three guards to be voted second-team All-ACC.

Professional career

Minnesota Vikings
Isidora was drafted by the Minnesota Vikings in the fifth round, 180th overall pick, in the 2017 NFL Draft.

Isidora entered the 2018 season as a backup guard. He started two games at left guard in place of an injured Tom Compton.

Miami Dolphins
On August 30, 2019, Isidora was traded to the Miami Dolphins in exchange for a seventh round pick in the 2020 NFL Draft. He was placed on injured reserve on September 25, 2019.

On September 5, 2020, Isidora was waived by the Dolphins.

Kansas City Chiefs
On September 8, 2020, Isidora was signed to the Kansas City Chiefs' practice squad. He was elevated to the active roster on October 24 and 31 for the team's weeks 7 and 8 games against the Denver Broncos and New York Jets, and reverted to the practice squad after each game.

Pittsburgh Steelers
On December 15, 2020, the Pittsburgh Steelers signed Isidora off the Chiefs' practice squad.

Houston Texans
On July 31, 2021, Isidora signed with the Houston Texans. He was released on August 31, 2021.

Atlanta Falcons
On September 15, 2021, Isidora was signed to the Atlanta Falcons practice squad. Isidora was released on September 17, 2021.

Arizona Cardinals
Isidora signed with the Arizona Cardinals' practice squad on September 29, 2021. He signed a reserve/future contract with the Cardinals on January 19, 2022.

On August 30, 2022, Isidora was released by the Cardinals and signed to the practice squad the next day. He was released on November 2.

Tennessee Titans
On December 26, 2022, Isidora was signed to the Tennessee Titans practice squad.

References

External links
Atlanta Falcons bio

1994 births
Living people
American football offensive guards
Arizona Cardinals players
Atlanta Falcons players
Houston Texans players
Kansas City Chiefs players
Miami Dolphins players
Miami Hurricanes football players
Minnesota Vikings players
People from Weston, Florida
Pittsburgh Steelers players
Players of American football from Florida
Sportspeople from Broward County, Florida
Tennessee Titans players